The Gambling Man is a British three-part television serial, or long TV movie, first broadcast in 1995, starring Robson Green, directed by Norman Stone, based on a novel by Catherine Cookson.

Outline
Rory Connor (Robson Green) is a rent-collector on Tyneside with a passion for playing poker for high stakes, while Janie Waggett (Stephanie Putson) is the woman who loves him, standing by him through many troubles. Charlotte Kean (Sylvestra Le Touzel) is Connor's employer, and she too finds him attractive. He gets into bad company in the dark world of gambling, and is so sure that poker is his way to riches that he makes a terrible decision. He spends time trying,but still doesn't manage to meet Rafa.

The plot may be partly autobiographical, as Catherine Cookson’s own father was a bigamist and a gambler.

Production
Producer Ray Marshall bought the film rights to several of the period works of Catherine Cookson, beginning in 1989 with The Fifteen Streets, which had been turned into a successful stage play. These productions, sponsored by Tyne Tees Television, were very popular and drew between ten and fourteen million viewers each.

Cast
Robson Green as Rory Connor
Stephanie Putson as Janie Waggett
Ian Cullen as Paddy Connor
David Nellist as Jimmy Connor
Sylvestra Le Touzel as Charlotte Kean
Bernard Hill as Frank Nickle
Sammy Johnson as Victor Pittie
David Haddow as John George Armstrong
John Middleton as Mr Buckham
Frank Mills as Mr Kean
Ron Donachie as Alec McLean 
Peter Marshall as Chief Constable
Alan Mason as Mr Dryden
Richard Franklin as Gambler
T. R. Bowen as Mr Arden
Jean Southern as Mrs Tyler
Paul Colman as Gambler
Max Smith as Bill Waggett
Anne Kent as Lizzie O'Dowd
Dennis Lingard as Little Joe
Allen Mechen as Dan Pittie
Ron Senior Jr. as Sam Pittie
Amber Styles as Ruth Connor
Margery Bone as Maggie Ridley 
Lyn Douglas as Grannie Waggett
Sarah Finch as Mrs Buckham
Joe Ging as Dr Munday
Johnny Caesar as Mr Grable
Jan Gordon as Woman at Wedding 
Tony Hodge as Oakshott
Jim Killeen as Man at Gaming House
Anissa Ladjemi as Widow's Child
George Lavella as Look-Out Boy
Peter Marriner as Police Sergeant
Nick Nancarrow as Nipper
Bryan St. John as Older Policeman

Notes

External links

The Gambling Man (Part 1) full episode at dailymotion.com

1995 British television series debuts
1995 British television series endings
1990s British drama television series
ITV television dramas
1990s British television miniseries
Period television series
Television shows based on British novels
Television shows set in Tyne and Wear
Television series by ITV Studios
Television shows produced by Tyne Tees Television
English-language television shows
Television series set in the 1870s
British television films